Benedict Francis Woit (January 7, 1928 – December 7, 2016) was a Canadian ice hockey player. He played in the National Hockey League with the Detroit Red Wings and Chicago Black Hawks between 1951 and 1956. With Detroit he won the Stanley Cup three times, in 1952, 1954, and 1955

Playing career

Woit made his presence known as a junior while playing for the Port Arthur Flyers and Bruins of the Thunder Bay Junior Hockey League and the St. Michael's Majors of the Ontario Hockey Association. He began playing for the Indianapolis Capitals of the American Hockey League for the 1948–49 season. The Detroit Red Wings promoted him in 1951, and his defensive play would help them secure the Stanley Cup in 1952, 1954, and 1955. Woit was traded to Chicago Black Hawks following the 1954–55 season but never produced as he did with the Red Wings. He went on to play in the AHL and later the Eastern Hockey League, for the Clinton Comets as both a player and a successful head coach. In 334 NHL games Benny Woit recorded 7 goals and 26 assists for 33 points.

Woit died on December 7, 2016.

Career statistics

Regular season and playoffs

Awards and achievements
NHL All-Star Game (1954)
EHL First All-Star Team (1962, 1963)
EHL Second All-Star Team (1964)
EHL North First All-Star Team (1965)

References

External links
 

1928 births
2016 deaths
Canadian expatriate ice hockey players in the United States
Canadian ice hockey defencemen
Chicago Blackhawks players
Clinton Comets players
Detroit Red Wings players
Ice hockey people from Ontario
Indianapolis Capitals players
Jersey Devils players
Kingston Frontenacs (EPHL) players
Providence Reds players
Rochester Americans players
Sportspeople from Thunder Bay
Stanley Cup champions
Toronto St. Michael's Majors players